The Mahaar are a tribe of Jat origin found in Punjab.

Punjabi tribes